José Pedro is the main river of Conceição de Ipanema town in Brazil.

Rivers of Minas Gerais